The Bayer designation σ Ursae Majoris (Sigma Ursae Majoris, σ UMa) is shared by two star systems in the constellation Ursa Major:

 σ1 (11 Ursae Majoris)
 σ2 (13 Ursae Majoris)

They are separated by 0.33° in the sky.

The two stars, Sigma1 and Sigma2 together, are considered an optical double star. They are not a binary star, in that they are not gravitationally linked, but they are close to each other as seen in the sky.

Ursae Majoris, Sigma
Ursa Major (constellation)